Nizhneye Turovo is a rural locality (a selo) and the administrative center of Nizhneturovskoye Rural Settlement, Nizhnedevitsky District, Voronezh Oblast, Russia. The population was 488 as of 2018. There are 16 streets.

Geography 
Nizhneye Turovo is located 27 km east of Nizhnedevitsk (the district's administrative centre) by road. Verkhnenikolskoye is the nearest rural locality.

References 

Rural localities in Nizhnedevitsky District